Sonola is the debut studio album by Australian rock band The Black Sorrows. The album was released in June 1984 and consisted of cover versions of soul and R&B songs.

Background
In 1983, following the disbanding of Jo Jo Zep, Joe Camilleri gathered together a group of musician friends and dubbed them The Black Sorrows. The band began playing mostly covers of R&B, zydeco, soul and blues music 'for the fun of it'.

Camilleri says; "I remember playing birthday parties and weddings, just so I could get enough money to make a record. We made Sonola for $1300. I just wanted to have some sort of documentation that we existed. We did the artwork and screen-printed the covers. We’d put the covers on the line, one side only, waiting for them to dry, so we could do the other side. They’re the things you cherish, waiting for the record to be pressed and then having a lounge-room full of records and freaking out because you want to get rid of them."

Track listing 
 CD track listing

Charts

Personnel 
 Bass guitar – Wayne Duncan
 Clarinet, saxophone – Paul Williamson
 Cover – Neil Curtis
 Drums – Gary Young
 Guitar – Jeff Burstin
 Guitar, harmony vocals – Wayne Burt
 Piano accordion – George Butrumlis
 Producer, saxophone, vocals – Joey Vincent
 Recorded by Ross Cockle
 Remastered by Joe Camilleri
 Violin – Steve McTaggart

References

External links
 "Sonola" at discogs.com

1984 debut albums
The Black Sorrows albums
Albums produced by Joe Camilleri